Skam Records is an independent electronic music record label based in Manchester, England, founded by Andy Maddocks around 1990. Skam also runs a smaller sub-label called 33.

History
Skam's first 12-inch single was a self-titled debut from Lego Feet (Sean Booth and Rob Brown, later known as Autechre). The label followed with two 12" records from Gescom, a project whose members vary between each release.

Other early Skam releases came from Freeform (Simon Pyke), Bola, Jega, Team Doyobi, E.Stonji (Jens Döring), and Boards of Canada. Boards of Canada's Hi Scores EP, and Gescom's Keynell and Lego Feet have been re-pressed or reissued.

Skam entered the full-length market in 1998 with the releases of Soup by Bola and Music Has the Right to Children by Boards of Canada, the latter being jointly released with Warp Records.

A recurring feature on the packaging of Skam releases is the name of the label printed in braille.

Series releases
Skam makes multiple series of record releases within the label, all of which are an anagram of "SKAM". The first three records were produced in conjunction with German duo Musik Aus Strom, and the latter two by Skam alone.

Up until the 2004 release of Mr 76ix's Hits of 76ix, the label has produced a 7" single along with each full-length album; the 7" catalogue numbers begin with the letters "KMAS". Skam has since stated on its website that future KMAS releases will feature purely exclusive tracks to complement full-length recordings of the same number.

In 2001, Skam began the "SMAK" series. Each SMAK 12" showcased two artists, one per record side. Some SMAK artists, like Quinoline Yellow, have gone on to become full Skam musicians. NMB Allstars ("North Manchester Bedroom Allstars") went on to become part of the sublabel 33, which Skam has referred to as "a part of the family." Others, like Ola Bergman and Posthuman went on to set up their own record labels: New Speak and Seed Records, respectively. Made, are known for their live acts. In October 2004, Skam began the "AMKS" series with Supermechamaximegamegablast by Mortal and Chemist, which is, as the catalogue number may suggest, a mix.

Reception
Tim Haslett wrote of Skam in the October 1997 issue of CMJ New Music Monthly: "It looked for a while as though the minimalist electronic movement had simply disappeared into the valley of the self-indulgent and repetitive. The monotonous sound of a 909 kick drum and high-hat was really beginning to wear on the nerves of even the most committed techheads. Enter the Manchester-based Skam label, which has single-handedly invigorated a minimal techno sound that's not indebted to breakbeats or drum-and-bass. Having released early tracks by cult favorites Gescom and the Boards Of Canada, the Skam imprint has continued to thrive at the periphery of the crepuscular world of underground techno."

In the same magazine in March 1999, Haslett wrote that Skam:"is notorious for its elusiveness, its tendency to make available only tiny quantities of each release. This might seem an elitist marketing move, an attempt to restrict the audience, but the Skam folks spend so much attention to detail in artwork and sound quality that it's easy to forgive them."

Artists past and present

See also 
 List of record labels
 List of independent UK record labels

References

External links
 
 

English record labels
British independent record labels
Record labels established in 1990
Music in Manchester
Companies based in Manchester
Electronic music record labels
Electronic dance music record labels